Ron Zacapa Centenario is a premium rum produced in Guatemala by Rum Creation and Products, a subsidiary of Industrias Licoreras de Guatemala, and distributed and marketed by Diageo. Zacapa Centenario was created in 1976 to celebrate the hundredth anniversary of the foundation of Zacapa, a town in eastern Guatemala. It was the result of the blending, stabilization and maturing processes of long-aged rums by doctor and chemist named Alejandro Burgaleta. Ron Zacapa is distinctive in that it is aged in a facility at an altitude with natural coolness which avoids evaporation resulting in a usually smooth product.

History

Zacapa is a small town in eastern Guatemala founded in 1876. The rum was named for its 100th anniversary in 1976 and the name Zacapa has meaning "on the river of grass" and it s coming from Aztec (Nahuatl) language. Burgaleta also developed and created the rum Venado, another product of Industrias Licoreras de Guatemala. Early Zacapa bottles came in a bottle covered in a petate – a handwoven matting made from palm leaves which dates from the Mayan period made in Esquipulas, near the borders with Honduras and El Salvador, by traditional hat artisans.  More recently they feature a band around the middle of the bottle of Zacapa No. 23 Rum. Ron Zacapa Centenario 23 used to be known as Ron Zacapa Centenario 23 Años. Its name changed due to the confusion it caused, as people thought it was a 23-year-old rum instead of a blend of rums between 6 and 23 years old.

Awards
The rum won first place in the premium rums category 4 years in a row at the International Rum Festival 1998, 1999, 2000 and 2001. It was the first rum to be included in the International Rum Festival's Hall of Fame.

References

External links
Ron Zacapa Centenario website

Food and drink companies established in 1976
Food and drink companies of Guatemala
Guatemalan brands
Luxury brands
Diageo brands
Rums
1976 establishments in Guatemala
Products introduced in 1976